typedef is a reserved keyword in the programming languages C, C++, and Objective-C. It is used to create an additional name (alias) for another data type, but does not create a new type, except in the obscure case of a qualified typedef of an array type where the typedef qualifiers are transferred to the array element type. As such, it is often used to simplify the syntax of declaring complex data structures consisting of struct and union types, although it is also commonly used to provide specific descriptive type names for integer data types of varying sizes.

Syntax
A typedef declaration follows the same syntax as declaring any other C identifier. The keyword typedef itself is a specifier which means that while it typically appears at the start of the declaration, it can also appear after the type specifiers or between two of them.

This is practiced in other coding systems, although POSIX explicitly reserves this practice for POSIX data types.

Examples
This creates the type  as a synonym of the type :typedef int length;

Documentation use
A typedef declaration may be used as documentation by indicating the meaning of a variable within the programming context, e.g., it may include the expression of a unit of measurement or counts. The generic declarations,

int current_speed;
int high_score;

void congratulate(int your_score) {
    if (your_score > high_score) {
        // ...
    }
}

may be expressed by declaring context specific types:

typedef int km_per_hour;
typedef int points;

// `km_per_hour` is synonymous with `int` here, and thus, the compiler treats
// our new variables as integers.
km_per_hour current_speed;
points high_score;

void congratulate(points your_score) {
    if (your_score > high_score) {
        // ...
    }
}

Both sections of code execute identically. However, the use of typedef declarations in the second code block makes it clear that the two variables, while representing the same data type , store different or incompatible data. This would not be as apparent if both were declared as variables of  datatype.

void foo() {
    km_per_hour km100 = 100;
    congratulate(km100);
}

Type simplification
A typedef may be used to simplify the declaration of a compound type (struct, union) or pointer type. For example,

struct MyStruct {
    int data1;
    char data2;
};

This defines the data type . A variable declaration of this type in C also requires the keyword , but it may be omitted in C++:

struct MyStruct a;

A typedef declaration eliminates the requirement of specifying  in C. For example, the declaration

typedef struct MyStruct newtype;

is reduced to:

newtype a;

The structure declaration and typedef may also be combined into a single statement:

typedef struct MyStruct {
    int data1;
    char data2;
} newtype;

Or it may be used as follows:

typedef struct {
    int data1;
    char data2;
} newtype;

struct MyStruct x;
MyStruct y;

As such,  can be used wherever  can be used. However, the reverse is not true; for instance, the constructor methods for  cannot be named .

A notorious example where even C++ needs the  keyword is the POSIX stat system call that uses a struct of the same name in its arguments:

int stat(const char *filename, struct stat *buf)
{
    // ...
}

Here both C as well as C++ need the  keyword in the parameter definition.

Pointers
The typedef may be used to define a new pointer type.

typedef int *intptr;

intptr ptr;

// Same as:
// int *ptr;

 is a new alias with the pointer type . The definition, defines a variable  with the type . So,  is a pointer which can point to a variable of type .

Using typedef to define a new pointer type may sometimes lead to confusion. For example:

typedef int *intptr;

// Both 'cliff' and 'allen' are of type int*.
intptr cliff, allen;

// 'cliff2' is of type int*, but 'allen2' is of type int**.
intptr cliff2, *allen2;

// Same as:
// intptr cliff2;
// intptr *allen2;

Above,  means defining 2 variables with  type for both. This is because a type defined by typedef is a type, not an expansion. Shortly,  has the type, .

Constant pointers

Again, because typedef defines a type, not an expansion, declarations that use the const qualifier can yield unexpected or unintuitive results. The following example declares a constant pointer to an integer type, not a pointer to a constant integer:

typedef int *intptr;

const intptr ptr = NULL;

// Same as:
// int *const ptr = NULL;

Since it is a constant pointer, it must be initialized in the declaration.

Structures and structure pointers
Typedefs can also simplify definitions or declarations for structure pointer types. Consider this:

struct Node {
    int data;
    struct Node *nextptr;
};

Using typedef, the above code can be rewritten like this:

typedef struct Node Node;

struct Node {
    int data;
    Node *nextptr;
};

In C, one can declare multiple variables of the same type in a single statement, even mixing structure with pointer or non-pointers. However, one would need to prefix an asterisk to each variable to designate it as a pointer. This can lead to subtle syntax errors.

struct Node *startptr, *endptr, *curptr, *prevptr, errptr, *refptr;

By defining the typedef , it is assured that all variables are structure pointer types, or say, that each variable is a pointer type pointing to a structure type.

typedef struct Node* NodePtr;

NodePtr startptr, endptr, curptr, prevptr, errptr, refptr;

Function pointers
int do_math(float arg1, int arg2) {
    return arg2;
}

int call_a_func(int (*call_this)(float, int)) {
    int output = call_this(5.5, 7);

    return output;
}

int final_result = call_a_func(&do_math);

The preceding code may be rewritten with typedef specifications:

typedef int (*MathFunc)(float, int);

int do_math(float arg1, int arg2) {
    return arg2;
}

int call_a_func(MathFunc call_this) {
    int output = call_this(5.5, 7);

    return output;
}

int final_result = call_a_func(&do_math);

Here,  is the new alias for the type. A  is a pointer to a function that returns an integer and takes as arguments a float followed by an integer.

When a function returns a function pointer, it can be even more confusing without typedef. The following is the function prototype of signal(3) from FreeBSD:

void (*signal(int sig, void (*func)(int)))(int);

The function declaration above is cryptic as it does not clearly show what the function accepts as arguments, or the type that it returns. A novice programmer may even assume that the function accepts a single  as its argument and returns nothing, but in reality it also needs a function pointer and returns another function pointer. It can be written more cleanly:

typedef void (*sighandler_t)(int);

sighandler_t signal(int sig, sighandler_t func);

Arrays
A typedef can also be used to simplify the definition of array types. For example,

typedef char arrType[6];

arrType arr = {1, 2, 3, 4, 5, 6};
arrType *pArr;

// Same as:
// char arr[6] = {1, 2, 3, 4, 5, 6};
// char (*pArr)[6];

Here,  is the new alias for the  type, which is an array type with 6 elements. For ,  is a pointer pointing to the memory of the  type.

Type casts
A typedef is created using type definition syntax but can be used as if it were created using type cast syntax. (Type casting changes a data type.) For instance, in each line after the first line of:

// `funcptr` is a pointer to a function which takes a `double` and returns an `int`.
typedef int (*funcptr)(double);

// Valid in both C and C++.
funcptr x = (funcptr) NULL;

// Only valid in C++.
funcptr y = funcptr(NULL);
funcptr z = static_cast<funcptr>(NULL);

 is used on the left-hand side to declare a variable and is used on the right-hand side to cast a value. Thus, the typedef can be used by programmers who do not wish to figure out how to convert definition syntax to type cast syntax.

Without the typedef, it is generally not possible to use definition syntax and cast syntax interchangeably. For example:

void *p = NULL;

// This is legal.
int (*x)(double) = (int (*)(double)) p;

// Left-hand side is not legal.
int (*)(double) y = (int (*)(double)) p;

// Right-hand side is not legal.
int (*z)(double) = (int (*p)(double));

Usage in C++
In C++ type names can be complex, and typedef provides a mechanism to assign a simple name to the type.

std::vector<std::pair<std::string, int>> values;

for (std::vector<std::pair<std::string, int>>::const_iterator i = values.begin(); i != values.end(); ++i)
{
    std::pair<std::string, int> const & t = *i;

    // ...
}

and

typedef std::pair<std::string, int> value_t;
typedef std::vector<value_t> values_t;

values_t values;

for (values_t::const_iterator i = values.begin(); i != values.end(); ++i)
{
    value_t const & t = *i;

    // ...
}

For example, the above two typedefs could equivalently be written as

using value_t = std::pair<std::string, int>;
using values_t = std::vector<value_t>;

Use with templates
C++03 does not provide templated typedefs. For instance, to have  represent  for every type  one cannot use:

template<typename T>
typedef std::pair<std::string, T> stringpair<T>; // Doesn't work

template<typename T>
class stringpair
{
private:
    // Prevent instantiation of `stringpair<T>`.
    stringpair();
public:
    // Make `stringpair<T>::type` represent `std::pair<std::string, T>`.
    typedef std::pair<std::string, T> type;
};

// Declare a variable of type `std::pair<std::string, int>`.
stringpair<int>::type my_pair_of_string_and_int;

In C++11, templated typedefs are added with the following syntax, which requires the  keyword rather than the  keyword. (See template aliases.)

template <typename T>
using stringpair = std::pair<std::string, T>;

// Declare a variable of type `std::pair<std::string, int>`.
stringpair<int> my_pair_of_string_and_int;

Other languages
In SystemVerilog, typedef behaves exactly the way it does in C and C++.

In many statically typed functional languages, like Haskell, Miranda, OCaml, etc., one can define type synonyms, which are the same as typedefs in C. An example in Haskell:

type PairOfInts = (Int, Int)

This example has defined a type synonym  as an integer type.

In Seed7 the definition of a constant type is used to introduce a synonym for a type:

const type: myVector is array integer;

In Swift, one uses the  keyword to create a typedef:

typealias PairOfInts = (Int, Int)

C# contains a feature which is similar to the typedef or the  syntax of C++.

using newType = global::System.Runtime.Interop.Marshal;
using otherType = Enums.MyEnumType;
using StringListMap = System.Collections.Generic.Dictionary<string, System.Collections.Generic.List<string>>;

In D the keyword  allows to create type or partial type synonyms.

struct Foo(T){}
alias FooInt = Foo!int;
alias Fun = int delegate(int);

Usage concerns
Kernighan and Ritchie stated two reasons for using a typedef. First, it provides a means to make a program more portable or easier to maintain. Instead of having to change a type in every appearance throughout the program's source files, only a single typedef statement needs to be changed. size_t and ptrdiff_t in <stdlib.h> are such typedef names. Second, a typedef can make a complex definition or declaration easier to understand.

Some programmers are opposed to the extensive use of typedefs. Most arguments center on the idea that typedefs simply hide the actual data type of a variable. For example, Greg Kroah-Hartman, a Linux kernel hacker and documenter, discourages their use for anything except function prototype declarations. He argues that this practice not only unnecessarily obfuscates code, it can also cause programmers to accidentally misuse large structures thinking them to be simple types.

See also
Abstract data type
C syntax

References

C (programming language)
C++
Articles with example C code
Articles with example C++ code